Noreen Rice (19 February 1936 – 23 March 2015) was an artist born in Belfast. She exhibited for fifty years and worked in the USA, France and Switzerland and her work is included in the United Nations collection.

Life
Rice was born in Belfast in 1936. Her parents were Nell (born Hayes) and Johnny Rice. Her mother could sing and her father was a master mason. Her mothers singing brought in extra money after her father was posted overseas during World War Two. She went to Methodist College and by the age of fourteen she was living in the family home with lodgers as her parents were in Africa where her father was working. She wasn't academic and she took only a passing interest in becoming a secretary. A school friend said that all she wanted to do was draw.

The artist Gerard Dillon came from Belfast. Dillon helped Rice after they were introduced to each other by Rice's piano teacher in 1951. He was friends with the painter George Campbell. They both shared "an interest in bohemian characters". She regarded both Dillon and Campbell as her mentors for decades and her work was of a similar surrealistic and primitive style.

In 1956 she completed her first solo exhibition at the British Council in Hong Kong. She had been there since 1954 doing typing and practicing her painting. Her father was working there and she stayed in Hong Kong until the following year. When she returned she earned money working night shifts in the BBC news room.

Gerard Dillon and his sister, Mollie, had a property on Abbey Road in 1958. They let off part of the house to artist Arthur Armstrong and they let a flat to Noreen and her brother. Dillon and Rice would tour junk yards to find objects like leather and string that they included in their artwork. The house was known for its ex-pat Irish artists which also included Aidan Higgins and Gerard Keenan.

In 1963 she went to the USA to exhibit and she had to be persuaded to find time to meet President Kennedy. This was three weeks before he was killed in Dallas. In 1967 she was in Paris leaning lithography where she married the German contemporary artist Haim Kern. Their child Tristran was born and the marriage soon ended and Rice left for Switzerland.

She married again after she returned to Ireland to live at Fermanagh. They had a daughter who was named Trasna ans she exhbited twice in Belfast. In 1997 a large collaboration with Felix Anaut resulted in images of Adam and Eve which was prepared for a Spanish arts festival which was near Zaragosa. Another large commission was to decorate the shutters of Pushkin House at Baronscourt for the Duchess of Abercorn in 2005.

Death and legacy
Rice died in County Monaghan in 2015 where she had lived for twenty years. She had completed her last exhibition in 2009, over fifty years after her first in Hong Kong. She had exhibited and she had her work in notable collections including the Unoted Nations. She was noted for only creating art when she wanted to, she had never conformed, Aeneas Bonner said in her obituary "Normality was a not a close acquaintance".

References

1936 births
2015 deaths
People from Belfast
Artists from Northern Ireland